Yamagishiella is a genus of colonial green algae in the family Volvocaceae. Yamagishiella differs from Eudorina by its isogamous sexual reproduction, but the vegetative morphology and asexual reproduction characteristics of these two genera (especially Y. unicocca and E. unicocca) are indistinguishable.

References

External links
 Yamagishiella - Description with pictures

Chlamydomonadales genera
Chlamydomonadales